Enantiomer self-disproportionation is a process in stereochemistry describing the separation of a non-racemic mixture of enantiomers in an enantioenriched fraction and a more racemic fraction as a result of the formation of heterochiral or homochiral aggregates. This process is known to occur in achiral column chromatography.  

The phenomenon was first reported in 1983 in the separation of an excess of
carbon-14 labeled (S)-(−)-nicotine enantiomer and its isomer. Two fractions were recorded, one containing racemic nicotine and the other pure (S) enantiomer.

In 2006,  Vadim A. Soloshonok introduced the term Enantiomer self-disproportionation or self-disproportionation of enantiomers. He investigated achiral separations of several trifluoromethyl compounds. 

By column chromatography on regular silica gel with a hexane / ethyl acetate eluent (5:1), a 66.6% ee sample of a trifluoromethyl substrate is separated into several fractions ranging from 8.1% ee for the first fraction collected to > 99.9% ee for the last fraction collected. A presence of a strong electronegative group in the substrate such as the trifluoromethyl group is a prerequisite. The effect disappears when a more polar eluent is selected. A possible explanation is offered. Compounds with large electronegative groups such as trifluoromethyl can form supramolecular associations or aggregates or clusters in which these groups are separated from each other as much as possible with minimized electrostatic repulsions.  When these associations are stacks of alternating (R) and (S) molecules (as in syndiotactic polymers) this can be accomplished very efficiently. This association will form a racemic fraction of relatively high molecular weight eluting more slowly than the non-associating enantiopure fraction.

See also 
 disproportionation

References 
  Unexpected phenomenon in the high-performance liquid chromatographic analysis of racemic 14C-labelled nicotine: Separation of enantiomers in a totally achiral system   K. C. Cundy, P. A. Crooks, J. Chromatogr. 1983, 281, 17. Abstract
  Remarkable Amplification of the Self-Disproportionation of Enantiomers on Achiral-Phase Chromatography Columns  Vadim A. Soloshonok Angewandte Chemie International Edition Volume 45, Issue 5, Pages 766 - 769 2006 Abstract

Stereochemistry